Hip Hop Locos is the second studio album by A Lighter Shade of Brown. It was released in 1992 through Pump Records with distribution via Quality Records.

Hip Hop Locos was not a success, peaking at No. 87 on the Top R&B/Hip-Hop Albums. "Homies" made it to No. 57 on the Billboard Hot 100 and No. 13 on the Hot Rap Singles. ""Interrogated Cause I'm Brown" was also released as a single. The duo supported the album with a North American tour.

Production
The recording sessions took place at Paramount Recording Studios, at Image Recorders, at 38 Fresh, and at Ameraycan Studios in Hollywood. The production was handled by Angelo "Stone Tha Lunatic" Trotter IV, DJ Romeo, Eddie "Coze Tha Grinch" Goodman, Jason Roberts, Jesse "Tootie" Lars, K.T., Stan "The Guitar Man" Jones and DTTX. Fabian Alfaro, who appeared on the debut, left A Lighter Shade of Brown before the recording sessions. The duo somewhat moved away from the Latin music sounds of Brown & Proud.

Critical reception

The Washington Post deemed the album "considerably stronger in both beats and lyrics" than the debut. The San Antonio Express-News considered it "a satisfying mix of Latino pride, social consciousness and plain fun." The Los Angeles Times noted that "the production values ... are much improved, with crisper beats and more riveting raps."

Track listing
"Intro" - 0:23
"Hip Hop Locos" - 3:30
"A Young Vato" - 3:47
"Spill the Rhyme" - 3:57
"Viva Zapata" - 2:05
"Check It Out" - 3:45
"Raize Up" - 4:05
"Alla en el Rancho Grande" - 0:22
"The Huggy Boy Show" - 0:40
"Homies" - 3:31
"Low Rider Madness" - 3:27
"Brownies" - 3:37
"Interrogated Cause I'm Brown, Pt. 1 & 2" (featuring A.L.T., Aztlan Nation, KAOS, Pee Bee, Street Mentality) - 5:16
"Spill the Wine" (DJ Muggs Remix) - 3:46

Sample credits
"Check It Out"
"Plantation Inn" by The Mar-Keys
"Terminator X Speaks With His Hands" by Public Enemy
"Caught, Can We Get a Witness?" by Public Enemy
"Homies"
"The Tracks of My Tears" by The Miracles
"Brownies"
"UFO" by ESG

Charts

References

External links

A Lighter Shade of Brown albums
1992 albums